This is a list of years in Colombia.

21st century

20th century

19th century

 
History of Colombia
Colombia history-related lists
Colombia